Nylen Glacier is a narrow glacier between Schlatter Glacier and Fountain Glacier in Asgard Range, McMurdo Dry Valleys; it flows south into Pearse Valley. Named by Advisory Committee on Antarctic Names (US-ACAN) (2004) after Thomas H. Nylen, United States Antarctic Program (USAP) geologist from the Department of Geology at Portland State University in Portland, Oregon who studied glaciers in the Taylor Valley area, 1999–2003.

Glaciers of the Asgard Range
McMurdo Dry Valleys